The Svorka Hydroelectric Power Station is a hydroelectric power station in the municipality of Surnadal in Møre og Romsdal county, Norway. The Svorka River is also regulated for the plant. The plant came into operation in 1963 and is owned 50% each by Svorka Energi and Statkraft.

References

Hydroelectric power stations in Norway
Surnadal
Energy infrastructure completed in 1963